Scope is a brand of mouthwash made by Procter & Gamble. It was introduced in 1966, and for many years has been a competitor of Listerine, the longtime dominant mouthwash product. The Scope has collaborated with other brands such as Crest and Oral-B.

Ingredients
The active ingredients of Scope Outlast are cetylpyridinium chloride, domiphen bromide, and denatured alcohol.

Inactive ingredients of Scope Outlast are water, glycerin, polysorbate 80, sodium saccharin, sodium benzoate, benzoic acid, Blue 1, and Yellow 5.

See also

 Listerine

References

External links
 Official Scope website

Dentifrices
Oral hygiene
Procter & Gamble brands
Products introduced in 1966